Ildar Raushanovich Akhmetzyanov (born 25 November 1983) is a Russian professional football coach and a former player. He is the manager with FC KAMAZ Naberezhnye Chelny.

External links
 

1983 births
People from Nizhnekamsk
Living people
Russian footballers
Russia under-21 international footballers
Association football defenders
Russian Premier League players
FC Amkar Perm players
FC Sibir Novosibirsk players
FC Kuban Krasnodar players
FC KAMAZ Naberezhnye Chelny players
FC Neftekhimik Nizhnekamsk players
Russian football managers
FC KAMAZ Naberezhnye Chelny managers
Sportspeople from Tatarstan